The men's and women's field hockey competitions at the 2006 South American Games were the first inclusion of hockey at the South American Games. Both tournaments were held in conjunction with one another between 9 and 19 November 2006 at the CeNARD Hockey Stadium in Buenos Aires, Argentina.

In the men's competition, Argentina won the gold medal by defeating Chile 6–0 in the final. Peru won the bronze medal by defeating Uruguay 3–0 in a penalty shoot-out following a 0–0 draw.

In the women's competition, Argentina won the gold medal by defeating Chile 4–0 in the final. Uruguay won the bronze medal by defeating Brazil 4–0.

Participating nations

Men's tournament

Women's tournament

Both Paraguay men's and women's teams withdrew prior to the tournament.

Medals

Medal summary

Medal table

Men's tournament

Pool matches

Medal round

Bronze-medal match

Gold-medal match

Final standings

 Qualified for the 2007 Pan American Games

Women's tournament

Pool matches

Medal round

Bronze-medal match

Gold-medal match

Final standings

 Qualified for the 2007 Pan American Games

References

2006 South American Games
2006 South American Games
South American Games
2006 South American Games events